A system of plant taxonomy by John Hutchinson, the Hutchinson system, was published as The families of flowering plants, arranged according to a new system based on their probable phylogeny (two volumes) in three editions; 1st edition 1926–1934; 2nd edition 1959; 3rd edition, 1973. This classification is according to the 1st Edition Volume 1: Dicotyledonae 1926 and Volume 2:Monocotyledonae 1934.

Hutchinson's system was one of the most influential revisions of taxonomy in the early twentieth century. Hutchinson is known for his 24 dicta on the classification of flowering plants. A key feature of his third edition in 1973 was based on the  habit of the plant namely that herbaceous plants or Herbaceae are phylogenetically more recent than woody plants or Lignosae.

Phylum Angiospermae

Subphylum Monocotyledons 
Divisions
 Calyciferae
 Corolliferae
 Glumiflorae

Calyciferae

Corolliferae

Glumiflorae

Subphylum Dicotyledons 
Divisions
 Archychlamydeae (Polypetalae)
 Metachlamydeae (Gamopetalae)

Archychlamydeae

References

Bibliography 

 
  In 
 
  Volume 1: Dicotyledonae 1926, Volume 2: Monocotyledonae 1934.
 , Volume 2 at Internet Archive, Available to borrow: 2 vols
 
 
 

system, Hutchinson